Dag Syver Arnesen (born 3 May 1950) is a Norwegian jazz pianist with a series of album releases.

Career 

Arnesen was born in Bergen, and studied classical piano under Jiri Hlinka at the Bergen Music Conservatory and got a commitment by Den Nationale Scene. Eventually he went to jazz and played in the 1970s with the Arvid Genius' orchestra, and led his own Trios, Quartets and Septetter og 13'tets. There were several records under his own name and he is still in the Bergen Big Band. Arnesen has also lived in Oslo and played in the jazz bands Søyr, Orleysa, various groups led by the late international Norwegian guitarist Thorgeir Stubø, vocalist Susanne Fuhr, saxophonists Knut Riisnæs and Odd Riisnæs and orchestra leader Kjell Karlsen. In the Bergen-based Sigurd Ulveseth Quartet he has participated on three releases, and Arnesen also led the local Evans Jazzclub.

His melodic style has been compared to Jan Johansson.

Honors 
2014: Gammleng Award category Jazz
2009: Buddyprisen, awarded at Dokkhuset in Trondheim.
2003: Sildajazz Prize
1994: The Grieg Prize
1993: NOPA work of the Year Prize for Rusler rundt 152''
1992: Vossajazzprisen
1982: Reenskog jazz Award

Discography 
An asterisk (*) indicates that the year is that of release.

See also 

 List of jazz pianists

References

External links 

Dag Arnesen Trio 1 on YouTube

20th-century Norwegian pianists
21st-century Norwegian pianists
Norwegian jazz pianists
Norwegian jazz composers
Musicians from Bergen
1950 births
Living people
Odin Records artists
Resonant Music artists
Losen Records artists
Taurus Records artists
Bergen Big Band members